Krauszów  is a village in the administrative district of Gmina Nowy Targ, within Nowy Targ County, Lesser Poland Voivodeship, in southern Poland.

The village has an approximate population of 700.

References

Villages in Nowy Targ County